The Fly Synthesis Storch is an Italian ultralight aircraft, designed and produced by Fly Synthesis, introduced in 1990. The aircraft is supplied as a complete ready-to-fly-aircraft or as a kit for amateur construction.

Design and development
The Storch was designed to comply with the Fédération Aéronautique Internationale microlight rules. It features a strut-braced high-wing, a two-seats-in-side-by-side configuration enclosed cockpit, fixed tricycle landing gear and a single engine in tractor configuration.

The aircraft is of mixed construction, with the fuselage made from composites and the tail boom an aluminum tube. Standard engines available are the  Rotax 912UL and the  Jabiru 2200 four-stroke powerplants. All controls are operated by teleflex cables, except the ailerons, which are operated by push-pull tubes.

Variants
Storch CL
Storch HS
Gross weight of  It is sold as the Lafayette Stork Super Sport in the USA.
Storch S

Specifications (Storch HS)

References

External links

1990s Italian ultralight aircraft
Homebuilt aircraft
Light-sport aircraft
High-wing aircraft
Single-engined tractor aircraft